Animal Farm is a 1945 novel by George Orwell.

Animal Farm may also refer to:

Films based on the novel
 Animal Farm (1954 film), an animated film based on the book
 Animal Farm (1999 film), a live action film based on the book
 Animal Farm (upcoming film), an animated film based on the book

Other uses
 Animal Farm (video), pornographic film 
 "Animal Farm" (song), by The Kinks
 "Animal Farm", a song by Greenslade from the 1975 album Time and Tide
 "Animal Farm", a song by Clutch from the 1995 album Clutch
 "Animal Farm", a song by Bibi from her upcoming debut studio album
 "Animal Farm", an episode of HBO drama Oz
 "Animal Farm", adapted by Peter Hall, National Theatre) 1984

See also
Farm